Tresse (plural: tresses) may refer to:
 a word borrowed from French, meaning tress, braided, plait or lace, as found in Lady's tresses; orchids in the genus Spiranthes; or a Swiss plaited bread
 Tresse cheese, a form of string cheese originating in Syria
 John Tresse, a Norwegian handball player and coach
 Tresses, a commune in the Gironde department in Nouvelle-Aquitaine in southwestern France

See also 
 Tressé, a commune in the Ille-et-Vilaine department of Brittany in northwestern metropolitan France
 Tress (disambiguation)